is a hill near Porangahau, south of Waipukurau in southern Hawke's Bay, New Zealand. The hill is notable primarily for its unusually long name, which is of Māori origin; it is often shortened to Taumata for brevity. It has gained a measure of fame as it is the longest place name found in any English-speaking country, and possibly the longest place name in the world, according to World Atlas. The name of the hill (with 85 characters) has also been listed in the Guinness World Records as the longest place name. 
Other versions of the name, including longer ones, are also sometimes used.

Pronunciation

Meaning of the name
The name "" translates roughly as "The summit where Tamatea, the man with the big knees, the slider, climber of mountains, the land-swallower who travelled about, played his  (flute) to his loved one". Parsed by individual words: Taumata whaka tangi hanga koauau O tamatea turipukaka piki maunga horo nuku pokai whenua ki tana tahu.

Other versions

Some forms of the name are longer still: "" has 92 letters. An even longer version, Taumata-whakatangihanga-koauau-o-Tamatea-haumai-tawhiti-ure-haea-turi-pukaka-piki-maunga-horo-nuku-pokai-whenua-ki-tana-tahu, has 105 letters and means "The hill of the flute playing by Tamatea – who was blown hither from afar, had a slit penis, grazed his knees climbing mountains, fell on the earth, and encircled the land – to his beloved one".

Maps from 1929 published by the Department of Lands and Survey use a 28-character name "". In 1941, the Honorary Geographic Board of New Zealand renamed the hill to a 57-character name "", which has been an official name since 1948, and first appeared in a 1955 map. The New Zealand Geographic Placenames Database, maintained by Land Information New Zealand (LINZ), shows the official name with macrons "".

Tamatea, explorer of the land
Tamatea-pōkai-whenua (Tamatea the explorer of the land) was the father of Kahungunu, ancestor of the Ngāti Kahungunu iwi (tribe). Mention of Tamatea's explorations of the land occur not only in Ngāti Kahungunu legends, but also in the traditions of iwi from Northland, where he is said to have explored the Hokianga and Kaipara harbours.

In traditions from the Bay of Plenty Region, he left a son, Ranginui, who is the ancestor of Ngāti Ranginui of Tauranga. Legends from the East Coast of the North Island tell of his explorations in Tūranga-nui (Gisborne), Māhia, Wairoa, Ahuriri (Napier), Heretaunga (near Hastings) and Pōrangahau. He travelled via the Mangakopikopiko River, over the Tītī-o-kura saddle via Pohokura to Taupō-nui-a-Tia (Lake Taupō). The Ōtamatea River and swamp is named after him. Tamatea is also the name of a place in Napier.

Early South Island legends say that Tamatea sailed down the east coast. His canoe was wrecked in the far south, and transformed into Tākitimu mountain range. Tamatea then returned to the North Island, and travelled via the Whanganui River.

In popular culture
The name is featured in a Mountain Dew jingle and a SEEK Learning TV ad in Australia. It also appears in the 1976 (re-released in 1979) single "The Lone Ranger" by British band Quantum Jump, which featured in the title sequence of the second series of The Kenny Everett Video Show. It is the subject of a 1960 song by the New Zealand balladeer Peter Cape. Tennis star Martina Navratilova learned to say the word when she was ten years old.

See also
 List of long place names
 Longest place names in English

References

Central Hawke's Bay District
Hills of New Zealand
Landforms of the Hawke's Bay Region
Long words